Comedians is a 1954 Spanish drama film directed by Juan Antonio Bardem. It was coproduced with Argentina but it is a Spanish film about Spaniards actors on stage. Bardem confessed to being inspired by All About Eve. The film was entered into the 1954 Cannes Film Festival.

Bardem remade Cómicos as a musical in 1971, Variety starring Sara Montiel.

Plot 
Ana Ruiz (Elisa Christian Galvé) is a young and ambitious actress who has so far only had the opportunity to play secondary roles. But she finally gets her big chance to take on a leading role. The only condition set by businessman Carlos Márquez (Carlos Casaravilla) is that Ana becomes his lover. But she is in love with Miguel (Fernando Rey).

Cast
 Elisa Galvé - Ana Ruiz (as Christian Galvé)
 Fernando Rey - Miguel
 Emma Penella - Marga
 Rosario García Ortega - Doña carmen
 Mariano Asquerino - Don Antonio
 Carlos Casaravilla - Carlos
 Rafael Alonso - Ernesto Blasco
 Manuel Arbó - Rafael Muñoz
 Matilde Muñoz Sampedro - Matilde Agustín
 Aníbal Vela - Empresario

References

External links
 

1954 films
1954 drama films
1950s Spanish-language films
Spanish black-and-white films
Spain in fiction
Films directed by Juan Antonio Bardem
Films produced by Ricardo Sanz
Argentine drama films
Spanish drama films
1950s Spanish films